Ras al-Maara is a Syrian village in the Yabroud District of the Rif Dimashq Governorate. According to the Syria Central Bureau of Statistics (CBS), Ras al-Maara had a population of 8,520 in the 2004 census.

References

Populated places in Yabroud District